Kok Kum Woh (born 18 May 1915, date of death unknown) was a Singaporean sports shooter. He competed for Singapore at the 1960 Summer Olympics and for Malaysia at the 1964 Summer Olympics. He also competed at the 1962 and 1966 Asian Games.

References

External links
 

1915 births
Year of death missing
Singaporean male sport shooters
Olympic shooters of Singapore
Olympic shooters of Malaysia
Shooters at the 1960 Summer Olympics
Shooters at the 1964 Summer Olympics
Shooters at the 1962 Asian Games
Shooters at the 1966 Asian Games
Asian Games competitors for Singapore